The Ecclesiastical Licences Act 1533 (25 Hen 8 c 21), also known as the Act Concerning Peter's Pence and Dispensations, is an Act of the Parliament of England. It was passed by the English Reformation Parliament in the early part of 1534 and outlawed the payment of Peter's Pence and other payments to Rome. The Act remained partly in force in Great Britain at the end of 2010. It is under section III of this Act, that the Archbishop of Canterbury can award a Lambeth degree as an academic degree.

History
Peter's Pence was originally an annual tribute of one penny from each householder owning a land of a certain value to the Pope and had been collected in England since the reign of King Alfred. In the twelfth century it was fixed at an annual sum of £200 for the whole realm. It was not the largest payment to Rome but it is argued by Stanford Lehmberg that it was deliberately mentioned in the Act because it was theoretically paid by laymen and thus might have seemed more intolerable than payments affecting clerics only.

The Act abolished Peter's Pence and all other payments to Rome and accorded to the Archbishop of Canterbury the power to issue dispensations formerly given by the Pope. The fees which might have been charged for the dispensations were set and required royal assent, confirmed by the Great Seal of the Realm, in matters for which the usual fee was over £4.

On the 12 March 1534 the Commons passed the Bill and were possibly responsible, argues Lehmberg, for the clauses which claimed that the Act should not be read as a decline from the "very articles of the catholic faith of Christendom". A clause in the Bill gave the Crown the power to conduct visitations of monasteries which had been exempt from the Archbishop's jurisdiction and forbade English clergy from visiting religious assemblies abroad.

When the Bill came to the Upper House some clauses were added in the second and third reading. The Bill was passed on the 20 March after the fourth reading and after the Commons assented to the new clauses immediately. On the final day of the session, however, one more clause was added: the King would have the power at any period before 24 June to abrogate the complete Act or just a section of it as he so wished. Lehmberg puts forth the idea that Henry VIII still wanted some leverage in bargaining with the Pope after the French King recently attempted to reconcile Henry with Pope Clement VII. The final clause was never used as the French mission did not succeed.

Provisions

Preamble
The preamble is noteworthy because it is written in the form of a petition from the Commons to the King and is one of the first mentions of a "papal usurpation" and because it reasserts the theory that England has "no superior under God, but only your Grace". It also claims that the authority of the King's "imperial crown" is diminished by "the unreasonable and uncharitable usurpations and exactions" of the Pope.

The preamble was repealed by section 1 of, and Part II of the Schedule to, the Statute Law (Repeals) Act 1969.

Section 1
This section was repealed by section 1 of, and Part II of the Schedule to, the Statute Law (Repeals) Act 1969.

Section 2
This section was repealed by section 1 of, and Part II of the Schedule to, the Statute Law (Repeals) Act 1969.

Section 5
This section (which amongst other things had the effect of requiring faculties to be registered by the Clerk of the Crown in Chancery) does not apply in relation to any faculty granted to a public notary.

Section 7
The words at the end of this section were repealed by section 4(a) of the Statute Law Revision Act 1948.

Section 11
As to this section, see section 5 of the Public Notaries Act 1843.

In this section (which relates to refusal of archbishop to grant licences etc.) any reference to the Lord Chancellor or Lord Keeper of the Great Seal (however expressed) is to be read as a reference to the Chancellor of the High Court. The Chancellor of the High Court may nominate another judge of that court to exercise his functions under this section.

Section 15
This section was repealed by section 1 of, and Part II of the Schedule to, the Statute Law (Repeals) Act 1969.

Section 16
This section was repealed by section 13 of, and Part I of Schedule 4 to, the Criminal Law Act 1967.

Section 19
This section was repealed by the Statute Law Revision Act 1948.

Section 20
This section was repealed by the Statute Law Revision Act 1948.

Section 21
This section was repealed by section 1 of, and Part II of the Schedule to, the Statute Law (Repeals) Act 1969.

Section 22
This section was repealed by the Statute Law Revision Act 1948.

Section 23
This section was repealed by section 1 of, and Part II of the Schedule to, the Statute Law (Repeals) Act 1969.

Saving
The repeal by the Statute Law (Repeals) Act 1969 of section 2 of the Act of Supremacy (1 Eliz 1 c 1) (1558) does not affect the continued operation, so far as unrepealed, of the Ecclesiastical Licences Act 1533.

Repeal in the Republic of Ireland
This Act was repealed for the Republic of Ireland by sections 2(1) and 3(1) of, and Part 2 of Schedule 2 to, the Statute Law Revision Act 2007.

Notes

References
Stanford E. Lehmberg, The Reformation Parliament, 1529 - 1536 (Cambridge University Press, 1970).
Halsbury's Statutes,

External links
The Ecclesiastical Licences Act 1533, as amended, from the National Archives.
List of repeals in the Republic of Ireland from the Irish Statute Book.

Peter's
Acts of the Parliament of England still in force
1534 in law
1534 in England
1534 in Christianity